WLZX may refer to:

 WLZX (AM), a radio station (1600 AM) licensed to serve East Longmeadow, Massachusetts, United States
 WLZX-FM, a radio station (99.3 FM) licensed to serve Northampton, Massachusetts